Fred Baier is an avant garde British furniture designer maker working since the 1970s when he graduated from the Royal College of Art and taught at what is now Faculty of Arts (University of Brighton).

Some of his original work drew its influence from Industrial imagery concepts such as hydraulic pistons, bridges and electrical booster systems, using of brightly coloured stained woods. Since the Seventies he has used convergent technologies including computers, mathematics, and theories of proportion in his furniture designs.

In 2011 Fred Baier was commissioned to create furniture for the library at The House of Lords and was invited to show retrospective furniture designs at a one-man show at the Crafts Study Centre.

Further reading
Articles 
 Broun, Jeremy. (Apr-May 1990). "The golden age of contemporary craftsmanship. Part 1". Woodworking International, no. 16, pp. 26–31. 
 Frost, Abigail. (1990) "Fred Baier. Tales from New York." Interiors Quarterly. no. 10, pp. 12–15.
 Harding, Lovette. (Dec. 1990-Jan. 1991). "Illusions of grandeur." Metropolitan Home [UK], no. 3, pp. 70–73. -- brief profile of Baier.

Books
 Houston, John. Fred Baier : Furniture in studio. London : Bellow, 1990. .
 Baier, Fred. "Vision and Reality : Contemporary Practice for Furniture Makers". Shipley Art Gallery, Gateshead. 2001 

1949 births
Alumni of the Royal College of Art
British furniture designers
Living people